Schoenberg is a surname. Notable persons with that surname include:

 Adam Schoenberg (born 1980), American composer
 Arnold Schoenberg (1874–1951), Austrian-American composer
 Claude-Michel Schoenberg (born 1944), French record producer, actor, singer, popular songwriter, and musical theatre composer
 E. Randol Schoenberg (born 1966), American lawyer and grandson of Arnold Schoenberg
 Gertrud Schoenberg (1898–1967), librettist and publisher, second wife of Arnold Schoenberg
 Isaac Jacob Schoenberg (1903–1990), Romanian mathematician
 Mario Schoenberg (1914–1990), Brazilian physicist
 Michael Schoenberg (1939–2008), American geophysicist

See also
 Schönberg (disambiguation), Schoenberg is a common re-spelling of Schönberg
 Shoenberg (disambiguation)
 Schöneberg (disambiguation)

German-language surnames
Jewish surnames
Yiddish-language surnames

nl:Schönberg